Pawnbroker is a pioneering rear-engined  dragster built in 1969.

History
In 1969, prodded to action by the death of John Mulligan earlier in the year, Woody Gilmore (following the mid-engined Funny Car he built for Doug Thorley) and Pat Foster developed a rear-engined fuel dragster, which was unveiled in December. Gilmore and Foster built a similar car for Dwane Ong, incorporating the lessons of the previous car; vertical struts, with no wing (yet), prevented side-to-side motion. Powered by a Ramchargers-built engine, Pawnbroker ran -wide M&H slicks on -wide rims, rather than the usual  and  widths.

Sponsored by Hastings Manufacturing's oil additive, Torque, it debuted in Las Vegas, Nevada, in 1970, and wore livery of white overall with red and blue longitudinal stripes along the si. 

In August, Ong won the 1970 AHRA Nationals in the car.

Ong ran the car mostly at AHRA events before switching back to Funny Car.

Notes

1970s cars
Drag racing cars
Rear-wheel-drive vehicles